Drissa Diarra (born 1 May 1999) is a Malian footballer who plays as a centre back for AS Bamako and the Mali national team.

International career
Diarra made his professional debut with the Mali national team in a 1–1 friendly tie with Senegal on 6 August 2017.

References

External links
 
 

1999 births
Living people
Sportspeople from Bamako
Malian footballers
Mali international footballers
Mali under-20 international footballers
Association football defenders
Malian Première Division players
Malian expatriate footballers
Malian expatriate sportspeople in Armenia
Expatriate footballers in Armenia
AS Bamako players
21st-century Malian people
Mali A' international footballers
2020 African Nations Championship players